Warrington is an unincorporated community in Brown Township, Hancock County, Indiana.

Geography

History
Warrington was first platted in by John Oldham in 1834. A post office was established at Warrington in 1849, and remained in operation until it was discontinued in 1919.

References

Unincorporated communities in Hancock County, Indiana
Unincorporated communities in Indiana
Indianapolis metropolitan area